Karvirala Kottagudem is a village in Suryapet district.

Geography
It is 6 km from Thungathurthy Mandal. Gorentla and Karvirala, Annaram and Maddirala are the nearest villages.

Temples
There are three temples:  Peddama Thalli, Renuka Yellamma, and Savarlachchamma.

References

Villages in Suryapet district